"To Be Loved by You" is a song by American country music singer Parker McCollum. It was released on January 1, 2021, as the second single from his debut studio album Gold Chain Cowboy, and released to country radio on January 25, 2021. McCollum wrote the song with Rhett Akins, and it was produced by Jon Randall.

Background
The Boot explained that the track came from McCollum made about his fiancée Hallie Ray Light that was written in a "stream-of-consciousness songwriting session" on his tour bus, before he finished it with Rhett Akins.

Content
Billy Dukes of Taste of Country described "To Be Loved by You" as a story about the "Texan mourning a girl that he foolishly let slip away". McCollum told Digital Journal that the track "is not really about a breakup, it's about figuring it out and navigating that part of your life."

Music video
The music video was uploaded on January 14, 2021, and was directed by Peter Zavadil. According to a description on U Music, it showcases McCollum's "energetical performance as he moves on from a relationship".

Credits and personnel
Credits adapted from Tidal.

 Parker McCollum – composer, lyricist, associated performer, lead vocals 
 Jon Randall – producer, associated performer, background vocals
 Rhett Akins – composer, lyricist
 Daniel Bacigalupi – assistant mastering engineer, studio personnel
 Michael Mechling – assistant mixer, assistant recording engineer, studio personnel
 Doug Belote – associated performer, drums
 Jimmy Wallance – associated performer, keyboards
 John Cowan – associated performer, background vocals
 Lex Price – associated performer, bass guitar
 Rob McNelley – associated performer, electric guitar
 Stanton Adcock – associated performer, electric guitar
 Ethan Barrette – assistant recording engineer, studio personnel
 Shani Gandhi – editor, engineer, recording engineer, studio personnel, vocal editing
 F. Reid Shippen – engineer, mix engineer, studio personnel
 Pete Lyman – mastering engineer, studio personnel
 Dan Davis – recording engineer, studio personnel

Charts

Weekly charts

Year-end charts

Certifications

Release history

References

2021 singles
2021 songs
Parker McCollum songs
Songs written by Rhett Akins
MCA Nashville Records singles